"Que Me Baile" is a song by Colombian hip-hop group ChocQuibTown and American singer Becky G. The song and its music video was released by Sony Music Latin on June 28, 2019, as the second single from ChocQuibTown sixth album, ChocQuib House (2020).

Charts

References

2019 singles
2019 songs
ChocQuibTown songs
Becky G songs
Spanish-language songs
Songs written by Becky G